The Tuparí languages of Brazil form a branch of the Tupian language family.

Internal classification
The Tupari languages are:
 Makuráp
 Nuclear Tupari
 Akuntsu–Mekéns (Sakirabiá, Waratégaya)
 Tuparí, Kepkiriwát, Wayoró

None are spoken by more than a few hundred people.

A more recent internal classification by Nikulin & Andrade (2020) is given below:

Tuparian
Makurap
Core Tuparian
Wayoró–Tuparí
Wayoró
Tuparí
Corumbiara
Mekéns
Akuntsú

Varieties
Below is a list of Tupari language varieties listed by Loukotka (1968), including names of unattested varieties.

Macuráp group
Macuráp - spoken at the sources of the Colorado River (Rondônia).
Kanuːa / Koaratíra / Canoê - spoken in the valley of Apidía and on the middle course of the Verde River, Rondônia.
Amniapé - spoken at the sources of the Mequéns River.
Guaratégaja / Mequen - spoken at the sources of the Verde River and Mequéns River in the same region.
Kabishiana - spoken between the Corumbiara River and Verde River, Rondônia.
Wayoró / Wyarú - spoken at the sources of the Terevinto River and Colorado River (Rondônia).
Apichum - spoken in the same region but exact location unknown.
Tupari / Wakaraü - once spoken on the upper course of the Branco River or São Simão River, the same territory; now probably extinct.

Kepkeriwát group
Kepkeriwát / Quepi-quiri-uate - spoken on the right bank of the Pimenta Bueno River.

Proto-language

Proto-Tuparí reconstructions by Moore and Vilacy Galucio (1994):

{| class="wikitable sortable" style="font-size: 85%"
! gloss !! Proto-Tuparí
|-
| ‘sweet potato’ || *gwagwo
|-
| ‘tapir’ || *ɨkwaay
|-
| ‘macaw’ || *pet+'a
|-
| ‘one’ || *kiẽt
|-
| ‘small’ || *Dĩĩt
|-
| ‘fish’ || *pot
|-
| ‘fowl’ || *õkɨra
|-
| ‘seed’ || *kit
|-
| ‘neck’ || *gwotkɨp
|-
| ‘heart’ || *ãnõã
|-
| ‘to know’ || *toã
|-
| ‘to give’ || *ñũã
|-
| ‘to speak’ || *mãYã
|-
| ‘sun, year’ || *ŋgiahkop
|-
| ‘stone’ || *ŋwa+'i
|-
| ‘earth’ || *kɨy
|-
| ‘fire; firewood’ || *agopkap
|-
| ‘mountain’ || *(n)dzo
|-
| ‘person’ || *aotse
|-
| ‘mother’ || *ñä
|-
| ‘husband’ || *mẽt
|-
| ‘hammock’ || *ẽ/*ĩnĩ
|-
| ‘seat’ || *ãβõ-pe
|-
| ‘seat’ || *ñãp-pe
|-
| ‘hair’ || *Dap
|-
| ‘tooth’ || *ñããy
|-
| ‘hand’ || *mbo
|-
| ‘nail’ || *mbo-ape
|-
| ‘skin’ || *pe
|-
| ‘liver’ || *pia
|-
| ‘foot’ || *mbi
|-
| ‘breast’ || *ŋẽp
|-
| ‘blood (n)’ || *a
|-
| ‘blood (n)’ || *eYɨ
|-
| ‘tobacco’ || *pitoa
|-
| ‘maize’ || *atsitsi
|-
| ‘axe’ || *gwi
|-
| ‘knife’ || *ŋgɨtpe
|-
| ‘timbo’ || *ŋĩk
|-
| ‘mortar’ || *ẽndzɨ
|-
| ‘salt’ || *ŋgɨɨt
|-
| ‘meat’ || *ñẽt+'ã
|-
| ‘water (n)’ || *ɨgɨ
|-
| ‘basin’ || *βãẽkɨt
|-
| ‘dust’ || *ñõ'õ
|-
| ‘path’ || *pee
|-
| ‘night’ || *ŋĩndak
|-
| ‘leaf’ || *Dep/*deep
|-
| ‘Brazil nut tree’ || *kãnã
|-
| ‘Brazil nut tree’ || *arao
|-
| ‘assai (palm)’ || *gwit+'i
|-
| ‘banana’ || *ehpiip
|-
| ‘cotton’ || *ororo
|-
| ‘genipap’ || *tsigaap
|-
| ‘peanut’ || *araɨgwi
|-
| ‘pepper’ || *kõỹ
|-
| ‘armadillo’ || *ndayto
|-
| ‘tail’ || *okway
|-
| ‘snake’ || *Dat/*daat
|-
| ‘lizard’ || *Dako
|-
| ‘turtle’ || *mbok+'a
|-
| ‘caiman’ || *gwaYto
|-
| ‘crab’ || *kera
|-
| ‘achiote’ || *ŋgop
|-
| ‘horn’ || *apikɨp
|-
| ‘paca’ || *gwãnãmbiro
|-
| ‘deer’ || *ɨtsɨɨ
|-
| ‘dog’ || *ãŋwẽko
|-
| ‘ocelot’ || *ãŋwẽko Dĩĩt
|-
| ‘agouti’ || *ŋwãkɨ̃ỹã
|-
| ‘bat’ || *ŋwari+'a
|-
| ‘coati’ || *pi'it
|-
| ‘capuchin monkey’ || *sahkɨrap
|-
| ‘spider monkey’ || *ãrĩmẽ
|-
| ‘honey marten’ (kinkajou?) || *ãmãnã
|-
| ‘peccary’ || *Daotse
|-
| ‘collared peccary’ || *Daotsey
|-
| ‘louse’ || *ãŋgɨp
|-
| ‘flea’ || *ñõk
|-
| ‘wasp’ || *ŋgap
|-
| ‘termite’ || *ŋgub+i
|-
| ‘big ant’ || *Dat+'a
|-
| ‘cockroach’ || *a
|-
| ‘cockroach’ || *eβape
|-
| ‘cicada’ || *ŋõtŋõna
|-
| ‘scorpion’ || *kɨtnĩŋã
|-
| ‘snail’ || *ɨ̃ỹã
|-
| ‘piranha’ || *ipñãỹ
|-
| ‘surubim’ || *ãnõrẽ
|-
| ‘mandi’ || *mõkoa
|-
| ‘toucan’ || *yo
|-
| ‘toucan’ || *ñõkãt
|-
| ‘duck’ || *ɨpek
|-
| ‘vulture’ || *ɨβe
|-
| ‘vulture’ || *ako
|-
| ‘hawk’ || *kẽỹ+'ã
|-
| ‘hummingbird’ || *mĩnĩt
|-
| ‘owl’ || *popoβa
|-
| ‘partridge’ || *kwãŋwã
|-
| ‘basket, big’ || *ãŋgerek
|-
| ‘canoe’ || *kɨp-pe
|-
| ‘clothing’ || *pe
|-
| ‘to drink’ || *ka
|-
| ‘to take’ || *ara
|-
| ‘to blow’ || *ɨβa
|-
| ‘to vomit’ || *ẽkẽt
|-
| ‘to push’ || *mõrã
|-
| ‘to swim’ || *tĩptĩpnã
|-
| ‘to see’ || *to'a
|-
| ‘to see’ || *-tso-
|-
| ‘hot’ || *ahkop
|-
| ‘good’ || *poat
|-
| ‘new’ || *pahgop
|-
| ‘old’ || *poot
|-
| ‘name’ || *Det
|-
| ‘sour’ || *kãỹ
|-
| ‘other’ || *nõõ
|-
| ‘smooth’ || *atsik
|-
| ‘rotten’ || *ãnde
|-
| ‘rotten’ || *ãkwĩ
|-
| ‘straight’ || *kɨɨt
|-
| ‘distant’ || *gwetsok
|-
| ‘2nd person’ || *ẽt
|}

Syntax
In all Tuparian languages, the main clauses follow the cross-linguistically rare nominative–absolutive pattern. Person prefixes on the verb are absolutive, i.e., they index the sole argument of an intransitive verb (S) and the patient argument ('direct object') of a transitive verb (P). Person pronouns, which follow the verb (either cliticizing to it or not) are nominative: they may encode the sole argument of an intransitive verb (S) or the agent argument of a transitive verb (A), but not the patient of a transitive verb (P). The example below is from Wayoró.

  Eamõjãn (en).
  s-V			(S)
  /e-amõc-a-t		(ẽt)/
  2-dance-TH-NFUT	(2.NOM)
  ‘You danced.’

  Etopkwap nã on.
  p-V			A
  /e-top-kʷ-a-p	nã	õt/
  2-see-PL-TH-p	FUT	1.NOM
  ‘I’ll see you every day.’

References

External links
 Amazonian Languages of Rondônia and Bolivia

Tupian languages